Starting Gate was located in Vallejo, California on California's historic U.S. Route 40, serving the East and North Bay counties of the San Francisco area.
The school was a co-educational pre-collegiate, non-profit facility governed by a board of trustees and supported by tuition revenue, charitable contributions, and endowment income. Starting Gate was a private K-12 school with a separate preschool facility.

History 
Starting Gate School began in 1972 when Genevieve M. Reignierd opened up a day care center for a local Episcopalian Church, which earned the reputation of providing higher learning for children. Genevieve also began teaching from her home later that same year. Students regularly participated in community outreach programs and volunteered their time outside of school. In 2012 the school held a fundraiser to honor the late Vallejo Police Officer Jim Capoot and his family with the dedication of a memorial sign.
Parents were encouraged to participate in school activities. Students took part in field trips, classroom presentations, class activities, and holiday parties. The school closed in 2020.

Notes and references

External links
 School website

High schools in Solano County, California
Private schools in California
Educational institutions established in 1972
1972 establishments in California
Schools in Vallejo, California